The white-lipped snake (Drysdalia coronoides) is a small species of venomous snake in the family Elapidae. The species is endemic to south-eastern mainland Australia and Tasmania.

Description 
It is the smallest of three species of snake found in Tasmania and is Australia's most cold-tolerant snake, even inhabiting areas on Mount Kosciuszko above the snow line. It belongs to the genus Drysdalia, and is often referred to as the whip snake in Tasmania (true whip snakes from Australia are from the genus Demansia and are only found on the mainland). This species gets its common name from a thin, white line bordered above by a narrow black line that runs along the upper lip. D. coronoides is viviparous.

References

Further reading
Boulenger GA (1896). Catalogue of the Snakes in the British Museum (Natural History). Volume III., Containing the Colubridæ (Opisthoglyphæ and Proteroglyphæ) ... London: Trustees of the British Museum (Natural History). (Taylor and Francis, printers). xiv + 727 pp. + Plates I-XXV. (Denisonia coronoides, new combination, pp. 336–337).
Cogger HG (2014). Reptiles and Amphibians of Australia, Seventh Edition. Clayton, Victoria, Australia: CSIRO Publishing. xxx + 1,033 pp. .
Günther A (1858). Catalogue of the Colubrine Snakes in the Collection of the British Museum. London: Trustees of the British Museum. (Taylor and Francis, printers). xvi + 281 pp. (Hoplocephalus coronoides, new species, pp. 215–216).
Wilson, Steve; Swan, Gerry (2013). A Complete Guide to Reptiles of Australia, Fourth Edition. Sydney: New Holland Publishers. 522 pp. .

External links
Drysdalia coronoides. The Encyclopedia of Life. EOL.org

coronoides
Reptiles described in 1858
Taxa named by Albert Günther
Snakes of Australia